Cerne may refer to:

People
 Joe Cerne (born 1942), U.S. American football player
 Rudi Cerne (born 1958), German figure skater and TV presenter
 Teja Černe (born 1984), Slovenian sailor

Places
Czech Republic
 Černé Voděrady, Czech Republic; a village
 Černé Budy, Czech Republic;, a town
 Újezd u Černé Hory, Czech Republic;, a village
 Černé jezero, Czech Republic;, a lake

United Kingdom
 Nether Cerne, a village in Dorset, England, UK
 Cerne Abbas, a village in Dorset, England, UK
 Cerne Abbey, former abbey in the village
 Cerne Abbas Giant, a geoglyph
 Up Cerne, a village in Dorset, England, UK
 Lingfield Cernes (SSSI) the Cernes of Lingfield, Surrey, England, UK
 River Cerne, a river in Dorset, England, UK

Ireland
 Cerne, a place in Meath, Ireland, with mythological and early medieval associations.

Other uses
 Oraesia cerne (O. cerne), a species of moth
 Cerne Skalicke, a variety of grape
 Book of Cerne, an Old English prayerbook

See also

 
 
 Cerne, Totcombe and Modbury Hundred, Dorset, England, UK
 Draycot Cerne, a village in Wiltshire, England, UK
 Cern (disambiguation)
 Sern (disambiguation)
 Kerne (disambiguation)

Slovene-language surnames